Šimonović is a Croatian surname. It may refer to:

Dubravka Šimonović (born 1958), Croatian lawyer and UN special rapporteur
Ivan Šimonović (born 1959), Croatian diplomat, politician and law scholar

See also
 Šimunović
 Simonović

Croatian surnames
Slavic-language surnames
Patronymic surnames
Surnames from given names